The Colonization of Greenland may refer to either:

 the Norse colonization of Greenland in the 10th century
 the Danish colonization of Greenland in the 18th century